Jeremiah Joseph Doyle (5 December 1849 – 1909), was an Irish born Catholic bishop, the bishop of Grafton.

Doyle was born at Kilmurry, County Cork, Ireland. He was the son of Daniel Doyle and his wife Ellen (née Murphy). He was educated in classics at Mount Melleray College, Waterford, and in 1868 he entered All Hallows College, Dublin.

Doyle was ordained a priest on 24 June 1874 for the Roman Catholic Diocese of Armidale, New South Wales, Australia.

Doyle was consecrated first Bishop of Grafton (now Lismore) by Cardinal Patrick Francis Moran in St Mary's Cathedral, Sydney, on 28 August 1887.

Doyle remain bishop until he died of cerebral haemorrhage in his house at Lismore, New South Wales, on 4 June 1909.

The diocese of Grafton was renamed to Lismore, and John Carroll became bishop of Lismore on 2 December 1909.

References

1849 births
1909 deaths
20th-century Roman Catholic bishops in Australia
Alumni of All Hallows College, Dublin
People from County Cork
19th-century Roman Catholic bishops in Australia
Roman Catholic bishops of Lismore